Jhandapur is a village in Sirathu Tehsil of Kaushambi District in Uttar Pradesh, India.
Jhandapur is situated between the main railway line of the Delhi-Howrah route and the Grand Trunk Road.
Shujatpur Railway Station is the nearest railway station.
It is 1 km from Shujatpur Railway Station, 10 km from Manjhanpur, the district headquarters of Kaushambi District, and around 600 km from New Delhi.
Jhandapur has a population of around 10000.
Main income source of people is business and jobs in Gulf countries.

Mohd. Akhtar is the Current Pradhan of Jhandapur.
The Majority of around 95% Population of Jhandapur are Muslims Belonging to Sunni Sect of Barelvi Firqa.
99% of which belong to GHOSI caste under MUSLIM GHOSI in Other Backward Class of UP ACT.
1% are from Other Casts of Muslims
Other 5% belongs to Hindu Dalit Casts.

There are 4 major Ponds in jhandapur.

There are 2 Masjids in Jhandapur

The Neibouring Bhatpurwa village is Also Mixed with same Population.

Villages in Kaushambi district